Vitamalt is a brand of non-alcoholic malt beverages manufactured and originated in Denmark and its taste might be described as sweet, unfermented beer. 

High on nutrients and vitamins, Vitamalt is a drink designed as an energy supplement. It is available in about 70 countries, but it is most widely known in the West Indies, where over time it has attained the status of a cultural symbol. 

The manufacturers have sponsored sporting events and clubs throughout the Caribbean. Cycling, running, basketball, football and amateur sports are activities that Vitamalt is usually associated with.

Because of high nutritional value and vitamin, mineral, protein and antioxidant content, the malt drink is sometimes consumed as an alternative to sports drinks or energy drinks. Containing no alcohol makes it halal.

The Vitamalt product range includes Vitamalt Plus, which contains acai, guarana and aloe vera, Vitamalt Ginger and Vitamalt Light, which has lower nutritional value.

The official tagline is "Vitamalt takes care of you".

See also
Malt beer 
Malta (drink) 
Supermalt

References

 http://jamaica-gleaner.com/gleaner/20130206/sports/sports7.html
 http://www.tribune242.com/news/2013/jan/14/vitamalt-official-malt-beverage-marathon-bahamas/
 http://www.royalunibrew.com/Default.aspx?ID=1830
 http://dominicavibes.dm/content/semi-finals-of-kubulivita-malt-1st-division-basketball-league-off-to-an-exciting-start#

External links
Vitamalt, The world´s favourite malt drink, home (official Vitamalt website)

Drink brands
Non-alcoholic drinks